Balsam "Krasnaya Polyana"  is a dark brown strong herbal liqueur, 45% abv. It is one of the traditional Eastern European beverages, called balsam.

Krasnaya Polyana Balsam is made with a combination of 24 herbs, 8 fruits, honey and other ingredients collected in the mountains area around the Black Sea. Among its natural ingredients are cherry plum and apple juices as well as morses of dried apricots, kiwi fruits and raisins. Its recipe was developed by the Russian Academy of Agricultural Sciences in the Scientific Research Institute of Food Biotechnology.

The balsam is commercially available for retail since 2003. Since then it was awarded many medals in various competitions of alcoholic beverages.
The production facility offers tours which include a tasting session of Krasnaya Polyana Balsam and other similar alcohol drinks.

Composition 

Krasnaya Polyana Balsam includes 38 ingredients, among which 32 are medical plants, including 24 herbs and 8 fruit crops in the form of infusions, morses and flavored spirits.

See also

 List of liqueurs

References

External links 
 http://balzamsochi.ru/  
 Top 10 traditional drinks in the Olympic capital 

Russian alcoholic drinks
Herbal liqueurs